This is a list of architects, urban planners, engineers, overseers and officials that were either born in Egypt, or lived and worked there for a significant part of their career and who had a notable impact on buildings and towns there.

Ancient Egyptian overseers 

 Imhotep (3rd Dynasty)
 Hemiunu (4th Dynasty)
 Senenmut (18th Dynasty)
 Amenhotep, son of Hapu (18th Dynasty)

19th Century planners and engineers 
During the 19th Century, planning and construction of villages and infrastructure was undertaken by archaeologists and engineers, especially those who headed the public works departments.

 Pascal Coste (1787–1879)
 Joseph Hekekyan (1807-1875)
 Linant Pasha (1799-1883)
 Ali Mubarak (1823-1893)

Pioneer architects 
A term coined by historians and peers for architects in Egypt that were very influential in the shaping of the profession, especially initiating a home-grown blend of Egyptian Modernist architecture, roughly during the second quarter of the 20th Century.
 Mostafa Mahmoud Fahmy (1886-1973)
 Ali Labib Gabr (1898-1966)
 Antoine Sleim Nahas (1901-1966)
 Mohamed Sherif Noman (1904-1985)
 Mahmoud Riad (1905-1977)
 Abubakr Khairat (1904-1951)
 Mohamed Kamal Ismail (1908 — 2008)
 Naoum Shebib   (1915–1985)
 Sayed Karim (1911-2005)
 Albert Khouri (1908- )
 Albert Zananiri (1908- )
 Charles Ayrout  (1905-1961)

Neo-vernacularists 
Architects that sought significant inspiration in their work, whether  from local vernacular architecture.

 Ramses Wissa Wassef (1911–1974)
 Hassan Fathy (1900-1989)
 Abdel-Wahed El-Wakil (1943- )
 Ramy al-Dahhan
 Soheir Farid

Pioneer and contemporary civil engineers 

 Michel Bakhoum (1913-1981)
 Milad Hanna (1924-2012)
 Hani Azer (1948- )

Contemporary architects 
Architects that practised over the second half of the 20th Century till present.

 Gamal Bakry (1926-2006)
 Farouk al-Gohary (1937-2020)
 Ahmed Mito
 Amany Kamel
 Hatem Said
 May al-Ibrashi

Contemporary urban planners 

 Abdelbaki Ibrahim (1926 — 2001)
 Abuzeid Rageh (1926 — 2020)
 Karim Zulfikar (1984 — )
 Maher Stino (1947 — )
 Mahmoud Yousry (1933 — 2015)
 Nasamat Abdelkader (1944 — )
 Shehab Mazhar (1954 — )

See also

 List of architects
 List of Egyptians

References

Egyptian
Architects